Il cielo in una stanza may refer to:
 "Il cielo in una stanza" (song), a 1960 song by Gino Paoli
 Il cielo in una stanza (film), a 1999 comedy film directed by Carlo Vanzina
 Il cielo in una stanza (album), a 1960 album by Mina